SS Arcadian was a Barrow-in-Furness built passenger liner constructed in 1899 by Vickers, Sons & Maxim Ltd for the Pacific Steam Navigation Company as SS Ortona. In World War I she served with the Royal Navy and was sunk by a U-boat in 1917.

Pacific Steam Navigation Company service, 1899–1906

SS Ortona was the last ship that Pacific Steam built for the London-to-Australia route. Launched on 10 July 1899 and registered in Liverpool on 26 October, she left London on her maiden voyage was on 24 November in a joint service with the Orient Steam Navigation Company. She carried 140 first-class, 180 second-class and 300 third-class passengers, a total of 620. In December 1902, Ortona was used to return troops to the UK after the end of the Second Boer War.

Royal Mail Steam Packet Company service, 1906–15

On 8 May 1906 Ortona was sold to the Royal Mail Steam Packet Company, who used her in a joint operation with the Orient line to Australia. The "All Golds"  professional New Zealand Rugby League team, travelled on Ortona from Australia to France via Ceylon in August/September 1907. In April 1909, she was transferred to the Royal Mail West Indies service. In 1910, she was sent to the Harland & Wolff shipyard in Belfast for conversion into a 320-capacity cruise ship with a new gross tonnage of 8,939. She was renamed RMS Arcadian  on 21 September 1910 as the RMSP's liners had names beginning with the letter "A", and was registered at Belfast in September of the following year. She started her first world cruise in January 1912, the largest dedicated cruise ship in the world at that time. She was on the first leg of this voyage that Olave St Claire Soames met Lieutenant General Sir Robert Baden-Powell, the founder of the Scout Movement, leading to their marriage in October of that year.

Admiralty service, 1915–17

In February 1915, Arcadian was hired by the Admiralty. On 7 April 1915 at Alexandria, General Sir Ian Hamilton came aboard and used Arcadian, together with the battleship Queen Elizabeth, as his headquarters ship during the opening phase of the Gallipoli Campaign. Once Hamilton's staff had transferred to a shore base at Imbros, Arcadian was employed as a troop ship in the Mediterranean.

On 15 April 1917 Arcadian was en route from Thessaloniki (Salonika) to Alexandria with a company of 1,335 troops and crew and escorted by a Japanese Navy destroyer. Shortly after completing a boat drill, while 26 miles north east of the Greek island of Milos, Arcadian was hit by a single torpedo from the German submarine  and sank within six minutes with the loss of 279 lives. A contemporary newspaper article described how four of Arcadian's overcrowded lifeboats were successfully lowered before she sank. Some of the dead were cooks and stokers who were working below decks. The escorting destroyer had two torpedoes launched at her while she was attempting to rescue men from the water; survivors reported that she had lowered three of her own boats while going "at full speed". More survivors, who had been clinging to a raft, were rescued at midnight by the Q-ship . Among the dead was the eminent bacteriologist, Sir Marc Armand Ruffer, who was returning to Alexandria after advising on the control of an epidemic among troops based at Thessaloniki.

References

Ship names
1899 ships
Ships built in Barrow-in-Furness
Maritime incidents in 1917
Passenger ships of the United Kingdom
Ships sunk by German submarines in World War I
Troop ships of the Royal Navy
World War I shipwrecks in the Mediterranean Sea